Kaushal Acharjee (born 30 December 1990) is an Indian first-class cricketer who plays for Tripura.

References

External links
 

1990 births
Living people
Indian cricketers
Tripura cricketers
Cricketers from Tripura
People from Agartala